Eversmannia is a genus of moths, belonging to the family Uraniidae.

The genus was described by Staudinger in 1871.

Species
 Eversmannia exornata (Eversmann, 1837)
 Eversmannia plagifera which is now Oroplema plagifera

References

Uraniidae